Trata pri Velesovem is a village in the Municipality of Cerklje na Gorenjskem in the Upper Carniola region of Slovenia.

Name
The name of the settlement was changed from Trata to Trata pri Velesovem in 1953.

Church
The Baroque church in the village is dedicated to Saint Margaret.

Notable people
Notable people that were born or lived in Trata pri Velesovem include:
Jože Šerjak (1918–1945), writer and poet

References

External links

Trata pri Velesovem on Geopedia

Populated places in the Municipality of Cerklje na Gorenjskem